Success is a southern suburb of Perth, the capital city of Western Australia, located within the City of Cockburn.

The name Success comes from Captain James Stirling's ship .

Urban development of Success didn't begin until the early 1990s when the Kwinana Freeway was extended to Forrest Road (now Armadale Road and Beeliar Drive). The population grew from 4,854 in the 2006 census to 10,148 in the 2016 census.

Amenities and facilities 
Success is home to Cockburn Gateway Shopping City, which features more than 180 stores, including Kmart (replaced Target in October 2020), Coles, Woolworths, Aldi, and Big W. The shopping centre also features five alfresco dining areas. 

Aubin Grove railway station is located at the southeastern end of Success and services the southern end of the suburb. The northern end is serviced by Cockburn Central railway station just outside its northeastern boundary.

References

External links

Suburbs of Perth, Western Australia
Suburbs in the City of Cockburn